Chevery is an unconstituted locality within the municipality of Côte-Nord-du-Golfe-du-Saint-Laurent in the Côte-Nord region of Quebec, Canada.

Chevery is the administrative centre of Côte-Nord-du-Golfe-du-Saint-Laurent municipality, located at the mouth of the Nétagamiou River. Previously known as Netagamu River, the place was renamed in 1971 after captain Jean-Baptiste Chevery who in 1747 sailed along the coast visiting numerous posts.

Chevery was the site of an early French fur trading post in the mid-17th century, but after that fort was abandoned, there was no further development on the site until the 1930s, when an experimental farm was established on the Cross River by William Anderson. Residents of several isolated communities in the area, including Gull Cliff Island and Aylmer Sound, subsequently moved to Chevery due to the need for improved access to government services.

The community of Chevery on the Gulf Saint Lawrence and boasts a vast network of inland wetlands, forest and tundra. The area is an ideal location for wilderness exploration, artistic inspiration and cultural discovery. From Chevery, one can access extensive trails and beaches through the unique northern landscape of the MRC du Golfe-du-Saint-Laurent. Chevery is renowned for the Netagamiou River and its 50 foot high falls that can be accessed from the Bob Nunez Misty River Trail.

Another renowned natural feature at the western end of Chevery is the "Sterant Island" Tern Colony. Only 100 meters off the beach, Sterant Island is easily visible for avid and budding conservationists and ornithologists who wish to observe, study and photograph the impressive tern colony for which the island gets its name.  Locals speculate that the name "Sterant Island" is an anglicized version of a French name "Île au Sterne".  Local records confirm that the Terns return annually to Chevery the third week of May and remain there to hatch and raise their young in the bait rich waters of Chevery during the summer. The terns leave gradually in early September and the colony is usually deserted by the mid-September each year.

Although predominantly Anglophone, Chevery has a significant number of Francophone and bilingual residents. None of Chevery's 251 residents are trilingual.

Demographics 

Education
Centre de Services scolaire du Littoral operates Netagamiou School (anglophone and francophone) in Chevery.

References

Communities in Côte-Nord
Designated places in Quebec
Unconstituted localities in Quebec
Road-inaccessible communities of Quebec